A quesadilla (Mexican diminutive of quesada) is a Mexican dish consisting of a tortilla that is filled primarily with cheese, and sometimes meats, spices, and other fillings, and then cooked on a griddle or stove. Traditionally, a corn tortilla is used, but it can also be made with a flour tortilla.

A full quesadilla is made with two tortillas that hold a layer of cheese between them. A half is a single tortilla that has been filled with cheese and folded into a half circle.

History
The quesadilla has its origins in colonial Mexico. The quesadilla as a dish has changed and evolved over many years as people have experimented with different variations of it. Quesadillas are frequently sold at Mexican restaurants all over the world.

Types

Original Mexican quesadilla

In the central and southern regions of Mexico, a quesadilla is a flat circle of cooked corn masa, called a tortilla, warmed to soften it enough to be folded in half, and then filled. They are typically filled with Oaxaca cheese (queso Oaxaca), a stringy Mexican cheese made by the pasta filata (stretched-curd) method. The quesadilla is then cooked on a comal until the cheese has completely melted. They are usually cooked without the addition of any oil. Often the quesadillas are served with green or red salsa, and guacamole. While Oaxaca (or string) cheese is the most common filling, other ingredients are also used in addition to, or even substituting for, the cheese. These can include cooked vegetables, such as potatoes with chorizo, squash blossoms, huitlacoche, and different types of cooked meat, such as chicharron, tinga made of chicken or beef, or cooked pork. In some places, quesadillas are also topped with other ingredients, in addition to the fillings they already have. Avocado or guacamole, chopped onion, tomato, serrano chiles, and cilantro are the most common. Salsas may also be added as a topping.

Mexican quesadillas are traditionally cooked on a comal, which is also used to prepare tortillas. As a variation, the quesadillas can be fried in oil to make quesadillas fritas. The main difference is that, while the traditional ones are prepared by filling the partially cooked tortillas, then cooked until the cheese melts, the fried ones are prepared like a pastry, preparing the uncooked masa in small circles, then topping with the filling and finally folding the quesadilla to form the pastry. It is then immersed into hot oil until the exterior looks golden and crispy.

Other variations include the use of wheat flour tortillas instead, especially in Northern Mexico. Wheat dough is most commonly used in place of corn masa. In this case, the flour tortilla is prepared, folded and filled with cheese (mainly Chihuahua cheese or queso menonita, a local cheese made by the Mennonites). The way of preparation is exactly the same as the corn variety.

While quesadillas in most of Mexico come with cheese, the quesadilla culture is different in Mexico City, where they do not automatically come with cheese unless you ask for it. This cultural trend can't be traced back to a single origin. 

Sometimes, cheese and ham are sandwiched between two flour tortillas, then cut into wedges to serve what is commonly known as a sincronizada (Spanish for "synchronized") in Mexico. Despite appearing almost the same as a quesadilla, it is considered a completely different dish. Tourists frequently confuse the sincronizada with the quesadilla because it is typically called a quesadilla in most Mexican restaurants outside of Mexico.

United States quesadilla

The quesadilla is a regional favorite in the southwestern U.S., where it is similar to a grilled cheese sandwich, with the inclusion of local ingredients. A flour tortilla is heated on a griddle, then flipped and sprinkled with a grated, usually high-moisture, melting cheese (queso quesadilla), such as Monterey Jack, Cheddar cheese, or Colby Jack. Once the cheese melts, other ingredients, such as shredded meat, peppers, onions, or guacamole may be added, and it is then folded and served.

Another preparation involves cheese and other ingredients sandwiched between two flour tortillas, with the whole package grilled on an oiled griddle and flipped so both sides are cooked and the cheese is melted. This version is often cut into wedges to serve. A home appliance (quesadilla maker) is sold to produce this kind of quesadilla, although it does not use oil and cooks both sides at once. This type is similar to the Mexican sincronizada; but in the United States, they often also have fajita beef or chicken or other ingredients instead of ham. That kind of quesadilla is also Mexican, and it is called "gringa" (the name varies in some regions in Mexico, including a type of quesadilla called "chavindeca").

Regional variations to specific recipes exist throughout the Southwest.

Variations
Quesadillas have been adapted to many different styles. In the United States, many restaurants serve them as appetizers, after adding their own twist. Some variations use goat cheese, black beans, spinach, zucchini, or tofu. A variation that combines the ingredients and cooking technique of a quesadilla with pizza toppings has been described as a "pizzadilla".

Even dessert quesadillas are made, using ingredients such as chocolate, butterscotch, caramel and different fruits.

Breakfast quesadillas are also made, using ingredients such as eggs, cheese and bacon.

See also

 Quesadilla Salvadoreña, a pan dulce traditional to Salvadoran cuisine
Arepas, similar dish native to northern South America
 List of maize dishes
 List of Mexican dishes

References

Further reading

External links

Cheese dishes
Street food
Mexican cuisine
Tex-Mex cuisine
Tortilla-based dishes
Articles containing video clips
Street food in Mexico